HAUS augmin-like complex subunit 1 is a protein that in humans is encoded by the HAUS1 gene.

References

External links

Further reading